Lord Wolfson may refer to:

Leonard Wolfson, Baron Wolfson (1927–2010), British businessman
David Wolfson, Baron Wolfson of Sunningdale (1935–2021), British politician and businessman
Simon Wolfson, Baron Wolfson of Apsley Guise (born 1967), British businessman
David Wolfson, Baron Wolfson of Tredegar (born 1968), British barrister and politician